The QBU-201 is a type of bolt-action anti-materiel rifle designed and manufactured by Chinese company Norinco. The weapon is chambered with improved 12.7×108mm high-precision ammunition in a 5-round box magazine. The rifle features a free-floating barrel, Picatinny rail, dual-chamber compensator, and a shoulder stock with a retractable recoil reducer.

Users
: People's Liberation Army Ground Force

See also
QBU-10

References

Sniper rifles of the People's Republic of China
12.7 mm firearms
Bolt-action rifles